is the capital city of Kōchi Prefecture located on the island of Shikoku in Japan. With over 40% of the prefectural population, Kōchi is the main commercial and industrial centre and the "primate city" of the prefecture. , the city had an estimated population of 320,513 in 164650 households, and a population density of 1000 persons per km².

Overview
A symbol of the city is its most famous dish, katsuo tataki, made by lightly searing and seasoning bonito.

Cityscape

Geography

Kōchi is located on the southern coast of Kōchi Prefecture, facing the Pacific Ocean to the south. The city area can be divided into three distinct geographic sections. The urban centre lies at the head of Urado Bay, in a narrow alluvial plain crossed by several rivers, notably the Kagami River and Kokubu River. The plain is bounded by mountains to the north and a range of hills to the south and west.

The northern mountains form the least densely populated part of the city, with the only settlement being along narrow river valleys.

To the south of the city centre, Urado Bay cuts through the hills to its outlet into the Pacific Ocean. The land surrounding the bay and a small strip of the coastline form the third part of the city. This area, although hillier and less dense than the plain, is nevertheless a major location of housing and port-related industry.

Neighbouring municipalities 
Kōchi Prefecture
 Nankoku
 Tosa City
 Tosa Town
 Ino

Climate
Kōchi has a very wet humid subtropical climate (Köppen climate classification Cfa), receiving twice as much rainfall as Shikoku's other chief cities Matsuyama and Takamatsu.

Demographics
Per Japanese census data, the population of Kōchi increased rapidly in the 1960s and 1970s, and has since leveled off.

History

Feudal period
As with all of Kōchi Prefecture, the area of Nahari was part of ancient Tosa Province. The river plain now containing the city centre was originally settled as a castle town around Kōchi Castle, the seat of the daimyō of Tosa Domain. The castle site was chosen by Yamauchi Kazutoyo in 1601 to replace the earlier seats of the Chōsokabe clan who had previously ruled in province. The city takes its name from that of the castle. As the centre of administration for the province, and the prefecture which succeeded it, the town rapidly grew to become the largest settlement of the region.

Meiji period
During the time of the Meiji Restoration, Kōchi became famous as a centre of pro-imperial ideology, and later for incubating democratic and human rights movements. The city was incorporated on April 1, 1889, with the establishment of the modern municipalities system..

Tram service began in the city on May 2, 1904, and the city was connected to the national rail network on November 12, 1951.

WWII air raid
Kōchi was selected as a target by the United States' XXI Bomber Command because of the city's status as a prefectural capital, and the fact that it was a centre for industry and commercial trade. On July 3, 1945, at 6:22 pm (JST) 129 aircraft took off to bomb Kōchi. 1060 tons of incendiary bombs were dropped on Kōchi, destroying 48% of the built up areas of the city, killing 401 civilians and rendering over 40,000 homeless.

Modern period
On April 1, 1998, the city was designated as the first core city on Shikoku.

On January 1, 2005, the villages of Kagami and Tosayama, both from Tosa District were merged into Kōchi.

On January 1, 2008, the town of Haruno (from Agawa District) was also merged into Kōchi.

Government

Kōchi has a mayor-council form of government with a directly elected mayor and a unicameral city council of 42 members. 
The current mayor (since 2003) is Seiya Okazaki.

Kōchi contributes 15 members to the Kōchi Prefectural Assembly. In terms of national politics, the city is divided between the Kōchi 1st district and Kōchi 2nd districts of the lower house of the Diet of Japan.

External relations

Twin towns/sister cities

International
Sister Cities

Friendship city

National
Sister city

Education

Universities
Kōchi is home to two universities, Kōchi University (national) and University of Kochi (prefectural), and four junior colleges including Kochi Junior College.
National university
Kōchi University
Public university
University of Kochi（Kōchi Prefectural University）
Private university
Kochi gakuen university
The Open University of Japan

Schools
Elementary and secondary education
Kōchi has 39 public elementary schools, 17 public middle schools and one public high school operated by the city government, one private and one national elementary school, and five private combined middle/high schools. The city has eight public high schools administered by the Kōchi Prefectural Department of Education. The prefecture also operates one middle school and one combined middle/high school.

Transport

Airport 
Kōchi Ryōma Airport, located in nearby Nankoku

Railways
Kōchi is located on the JR Shikoku's Dosan Line connecting it to northern Shikoku, and via interchanges with the Tosa Kuroshio Railway to the eastern and western parts of Kōchi Prefecture. JR's central station in Kōchi is Kōchi Station.

Conventional lines
 Shikoku Railway Company JR Shikoku Dosan Line

Tramways
The most visible form of transport within Kōchi is the tram service run by Tosaden Kōtsū. Its three lines with historic cars service the major north–south and east–west axes of the city.
Tosaden Kōtsū
Sanbashi Line
Gomen Line
Ino Line

Busways
The city also has an extensive bus network.

Highways
Kōchi is also serviced by the Kōchi interchange of the Kōchi Expressway which connects to the national expressway system.

Expressway
 Kōchi Expressway
 Kōchi-Tōbu Expressway

Japan National Route

Seaways
Port of Kōchi

Tourism

Kōchi Castle still exists in its pre-restoration form, and is one of the main tourist attractions.

Local attractions
The mountain  holds a public park with views of the city, and is home to stop 31 on the Shikoku Pilgrimage, Chikurin-ji, as well as the Makino Botanical Garden. 

Off Museum Road (Kenritsu Bijutsukandori) is The Museum of Art, Kōchi, where the main collection is composed of expressionistic works related to Kōchi.

The Former Yamauchi Residence and Tosa Yamauchi Family Treasury and Archives are also to be found in the city.

Historic spots
Castle
Kōchi Castle
Urado Castle ruins
Shrine
The Shinto Shrine Tosa jinja is located to the west.
Temples
Temples No.30 (Zenrakuji, No.31(Chikurin-ji) and No.33 (Sekkei-ji) on the Shikoku Pilgrimage are located in the city. 

At the mouth of Urado Bay, the remnants of Urado Castle (an earlier provincial seat) stand above , a famous beach with an aquarium and statue of the Kōchi hero Sakamoto Ryōma. 

Nearby on the grounds is the Sakamoto Ryōma Memorial Museum.

Culture

Festival・Events
Festival
Kōchi's most famous festival is the Yosakoi which is held in August. Teams of dancers dance to traditional and modern songs at various places around Kōchi. The total number of dancers is in the thousands.
Yosakoi
Events
Sunday street markets

Gourmet
Katsuo-no-tataki
Katsuobushi
SawachiDish Sushi
Tosa-maki

Museums
 Kōchi Castle Museum of History
 Kōchi Literary Museum
 Ryōma's Birthplace Memorial Museum
 Sakamoto Ryōma Memorial Museum
 The Museum of Art, Kōchi

Sports

Notable people from Kōchi

Nakahama Manjirō (1827–1898) was one of the first Japanese people to visit the United States and an important translator during the opening of Japan.
Okada Izō (1832–1865) was a samurai of the late Edo period, feared as one of the four most notable assassins of the Bakumatsu period.
Sakamoto Ryōma (1836–1867) was a leader of the movement to overthrow the Tokugawa shogunate during the Bakumatsu period. 
Itagaki Taisuke (1837–1919) was a politician and leader of the Freedom and People's Rights Movement, which evolved into Japan's first political party.
Tsutomu Seki (born 1930) is an astronomer who has discovered a number of comets and asteroids.
Nobuo Uematsu (born 1959) is a video game composer, best known for scoring the majority of titles in the Final Fantasy series. 
Ryōko Hirosue (born 1980) is an actress and pop star, best known in the West for her roles in the Luc Besson-produced Wasabi and the Academy Award-winning Japanese film Departures.
Aaron Zagory (born 1985) is a Kōchi-born former US college football player, and the starting kicker for Stanford University in 2006 and 2008.
Sumi Shimamoto (born 1954) is an anime voice actress, best known for playing Kyoko Otonashi in Maison Ikkoku and Nausicaa in Nausicaa of the Valley of the Wind.
Noa Tsurushima (born 2001) is a model and actress, best known for portraying Is and As in Kamen Rider Zero-One.
Tomitaro Makino (1862–1957) was a pioneering botanist, sometimes referred to as the Father of Japanese Botany.
Kusunose Kita (1836–1920) was an advocate for Women's rights in Japan, particularly in Kochi.
Tetsuya Nomura (born 1970) is a video game artist, designer and director who currently works for Square Enix. Famous for being a character designer for the Final Fantasy Series.
Nakamura Kazuha (born 2003) is a member of Korean girl group Le Sserafim.
Nonaka Shana (born 2003) is a member of Korean girl group Lapillus.

References

External links

Kōchi City official website 
Kōchi City official website 
 Kōchi Visitors and Convention Association official website
 Yosakoi Festival in Kōchi CityNHK
 

Cities in Kōchi Prefecture
Port settlements in Japan
Populated coastal places in Japan